Laceyella sediminis  is a thermophilic bacterium from the genus of Laceyella which has been isolated from sediments from a hot spring in Tengchong in China.

References

External links
Type strain of Laceyella sediminis at BacDive -  the Bacterial Diversity Metadatabase	

Bacillales
Bacteria described in 2012
Thermophiles